Asunafo North Municipal District is one of the six districts in Ahafo Region, Ghana. It was formerly part of the then-larger Asunafo District from 1988 until the southern part of the district was split off by a decree of president John Agyekum Kufuor on 12 November 2003 (effectively 17 February 2004) to become Asunafo South District. The municipality is located in the western part of Ahafo Region and has Goaso as its capital town.

History
Asunafo North Municipal District is one of the 260 Metropolitan, Municipal and District Assemblies (MMDAs) in Ghana, and forms part of the 6 Municipalities and Districts in the Ahafo Region. It was one of the first Districts created in the then Brong-Ahafo Region dating back as far as 1912.

Asunafo North Municipal District lies between latitudes 6°27°N and 7.00°N and longitudes 2°52°W and shares common boundaries with Asutifi South District in the north east, Dormaa Central Municipal on the north west and Juaboso District and Sefwi-Wiaso Municipal in Western North Region on the west-south borders, and Asunafo South District in the Ahafo Region on the south-eastern borders.

The total land size of the Municipality is 1093.7 km2 with 389.7 km2 covered by forest reserves. The population of the Municipality according to 2010 population and housing census stands at 124,685 with 62,854 males and 61,831 females.

List of settlements

Sources
 
 District: Asunafo North Municipal District
 19 New Districts Created, November 20, 2003.

References

Districts of Ahafo Region
States and territories established in 2003